Anthony Morin (born 27 June 1974 in Saint-Brieuc) is a French former racing cyclist.

Major results

1995
2nd Tour du Finistère
1996
3rd Grand Prix de la Ville de Lillers
1997
1st Stage 5 Tour de l'Avenir
1st Stage 4 Circuito Montañés
2000
2nd Overall Tour de Normandie
3rd National Road Race Championships
2001
1st Stage 5 Tour de France (TTT)
2nd Circuit de la Sarthe
2004
1st Stage 3 Tour de Guadeloupe

References

1974 births
Living people
French male cyclists
Sportspeople from Saint-Brieuc
Cyclists from Brittany